Pray for the Soul of Betty is the self-titled hard rock debut album of the band Pray for the Soul of Betty released on May 10, 2005, self-produced locally by the band, global release courtesy of Koch Entertainment, who released it in two editions, explicit and clean; re-engineered by Michael Burgman and Michael Barlie, re-mastered by Howie Weinburg; arranged, produced and performed by Pray for the Soul of Betty. The tracks were recorded, produced, and distributed locally in 2003 and 2004 by the band personally during live shows. Upon its release, the album scored #129 on The Billboard 200— #2 on Top Heatseekers, #7 on Top Independent Albums, and sold 7,500 on its first week.

Personnel
Pray for the Soul of Betty (Performance, Arranging, Producers, Writers)
Charlie Gambetta (Producer)
Howie Weinburg (Mastering)
Michael Barlie (Engineer)

Track listing
Drift 4:16
Rich Bitch 4:30
Truck Stop Sally 3:49
Some Of My Fucked-Up World 4:36
Cut The Cord 4:59
Cry 5:09
...The Day 4:22
Suicide 3:53
Playground 0:13
Sylvan 5:49

Releases
(2005) Koch Records #5837

Library of Congress
Control Number: 2005589061
Type of Material: Music sound recording
Call Numbers: SDB 24318 (Copy 1), SSA 67131 (Copy 2)
Location: Recorded Sound Reference Center (Madison, LM113)
Status: Not Charged
Contents: Drift, Rich bitch, Truck stop Sally, Someofmyfuckedupworld, Cut the cord, Cry, ...The day, Suicide, Playground, Sylvan.
Description: 1 sound disc : digital ; 4 in.
Published/Created:  New York, N.Y. : s.n., [2004]
UPC/EAN:  775020633728

Related albums
Constantine
Killer Queen: A Tribute to Queen

References

External links
Koch Entertainment
Billboard Profile

2005 debut albums
Pray for the Soul of Betty albums